Almeria may refer to:

Places
 Almería, a city in Spain, capital of the province of Almería
 Port of Almeria, the commercial port of Almería
 Almería, Colima, a municipio in Mexico
 Province of Almería, in southern Spain
 Almeria, Biliran, a municipality in the Philippines
 Almeria, Nebraska

Other uses
Almeria (moth), a moth genus
Almeria grape, a type of white grape
UD Almería, a football (soccer) club in the city of Almería
 5879 Almeria, an asteroid
Almería (album), a 2012 album by American alternative rock band Lifehouse
River Almería, a stretch of the Andarax
Almeria, a character in the 1697 play The Mourning Bride